Thomas Quiddington (christened 21 January 1743, Coulsdon, Surrey – buried 6 December 1804, Coulsdon) was a noted English cricketer of the mid-18th century who played for Surrey.

Career
Quiddington was a member of the famous Chertsey Cricket Club.  His name has the alternative spelling of Quiddenden.  He was primarily a bowler but his pace and style are unknown.  He was a long stop fielder and described as a "steady batter".

Quiddington's career probably began in the aftermath of the Seven Years' War and he was certainly active between the 1769 and 1784 seasons. He is first recorded playing for Caterham v Hambledon at Guildford Bason on 31 July and 1 August 1769, a game that Hambledon won by 4 wickets.

His last recorded appearance was for Chertsey v Coulsdon in June 1784.

References

English cricketers
English cricketers of 1701 to 1786
Surrey cricketers
1743 births
1804 deaths